John Hardy Goetz (October 24, 1937 – October 27, 2008) was an American professional baseball player. Despite being left handed, he was a right-handed pitcher. He appeared in four games for the  Chicago Cubs of Major League Baseball, but had an 11-year career in minor league baseball.

Goetz' Major League trial came at the outset of the 1960 Cubs' season. He made the team's 28-man early-season roster out of spring training and appeared as a relief pitcher in four contests. In his MLB debut, against the San Francisco Giants, he was effective, hurling 2⅔ innings of scoreless relief. But he was treated roughly in outings against the Giants the following week and against the St. Louis Cardinals in his last appearance, and was returned to the minors, where he spent the rest of his career. He retired from professional baseball after the 1965 season and 333 games played in the minors.

In 6⅓ Major League innings, Goetz allowed nine earned runs, ten hits and four bases on balls. He struck out six.

References

External links

1937 births
2008 deaths
Baseball players from Michigan
Burlington Bees players
Chicago Cubs players
Tacoma Giants players
Dallas Rangers players
El Paso Sun Kings players
Fort Worth Cats players
Houston Buffs players
Magic Valley Cowboys players
Major League Baseball pitchers
People from Chippewa County, Michigan
San Antonio Bullets players
San Antonio Missions players